Tour Cycliste Féminin International de l'Ardèche is a women's staged cycle race which takes place in the Ardèche region in southeastern France. The race was rated by the UCI as a 2.2 race, until 2018 when it was promoted to 2.1 status.

Following the collapse of the Tour de l'Aude Cycliste Féminin and the Route de France Féminine races in 2010 and 2016 respectively, the Tour de l'Ardèche became the only international level multi day stage race for women in France. The race was joined by Tour de France Femmes in 2022.

Previous winners

References

Cycle races in France
Women's road bicycle races